Lianhang Road is a station on Shanghai Metro Line 8.

This elevated station is part of the second phase of Line 8 in Minhang District. It is located at Puxing Highway and Lianyi Road.

References 
竹园路站建设用地规划许可证 
东方网上海频道(2007年12月11日) - 浦东轨交"新四线"2009年底全建成 动迁已基本完成 
文新传媒：轨交8号线还要往南延伸到航天公园站 

Railway stations in Shanghai
Shanghai Metro stations in Minhang District
Line 8, Shanghai Metro
Railway stations in China opened in 2009